Tshepo Seroalo (born 22 June 1997) is a South African cricketer. He made his first-class debut for North West in the 2016–17 Sunfoil 3-Day Cup on 17 November 2016. He made his List A debut for North West in the 2016–17 CSA Provincial One-Day Challenge on 20 November 2016.

References

External links
 

1997 births
Living people
South African cricketers
North West cricketers
Place of birth missing (living people)